District 4 is a district of the Texas House of Representatives that serves the whole of Kaufman County and a portion of western Henderson County. Its current representative is Keith Bell, who has served since 2019.

Major cities in the district include Kaufman, Terrell, Forney, and Athens.

List of representatives

References

004